Annette Louise Beautrais is a New Zealand suicidologist. She is an adjunct professor at the University of Canterbury in Christchurch, where she formerly directed the Canterbury Suicide Project prior to leaving in 2009 because some of her grant applications for a research project and a suicide coordinator at Canterbury were rejected. She is also affiliated with the University of Canterbury School of Health Sciences and is a senior research fellow at the University of Auckland's South Auckland Clinical School. She is also the World Health Organization's leader on suicide prevention strategy, and was the chair of two different symposia at the International Association for Suicide Prevention's 2015 conference in Montreal, Quebec, Canada. She is also one of two co-chairs of the International Association for Suicide Prevention's Emergency Medicine and Suicidal Behavior task force, and helped organize World Suicide Prevention Day events in 2009 around the world.

References

Suicidologists
New Zealand medical researchers
Academic staff of the University of Canterbury
Living people
Academic staff of the University of Auckland
Year of birth missing (living people)
Place of birth missing (living people)